Charles Alexandre Lesage (February 25, 1843 – May 15, 1893) was a physician and political figure in Quebec. He represented Dorchester in the House of Commons of Canada as a Conservative member from 1882 to 1887.

He was born in St-Grégoire-le-Grand (later part of Bécancour), Canada East, the son of F. Lesage, and was educated at the Université Laval. In 1867, he married Eleanor Vezina. Lesage was defeated by Henri Jules Juchereau Duchesnay when he ran for reelection in 1887.

References 
 
The Canadian parliamentary companion, 1885 JA Gemmill

1843 births
1893 deaths
Members of the House of Commons of Canada from Quebec
Conservative Party of Canada (1867–1942) MPs